Ultra Feel is an album by the Canadian hard rock band Rubber (formerly known as Harem Scarem).

Track listing (Canadian edition)

Personnel
Harry Hess - lead vocals, guitar, keyboards
Pete Lesperance - lead guitar, vocals, keyboards
Barry Donaghy - bass guitar, vocals
Creighton Doane - drums

References
 Liner notes from the album

2001 albums
Harem Scarem albums
Warner Music Group albums